Camilla Larsson (born 31 January 1975) is a road cyclist from Sweden. She represented her nation at the 2004 Summer Olympics. She also rode at the 2004 UCI Road World Championships.

References

Swedish female cyclists
Cyclists at the 2004 Summer Olympics
Olympic cyclists of Sweden
Living people
Place of birth missing (living people)
1975 births